Richard Martin "Prof" Edwards (born 3 June 1940), is a former cricketer. He played five Test matches as an opening bowler for the West Indies on the tour of Australia and New Zealand in 1968–69.

After leaving The Lodge School in Barbados, he played for Barbados between 1961–62 and 1969–70. Altogether he played 35 first-class matches in his career. His best bowling figures were 6 for 45 for Barbados against Leeward Islands in 1966/67.

He holds the record for the greatest number of runs scored off an eight-ball over with 34 (4, 0, 4, 4, 6, 6, 6, 4) bowled by Joey Carew, Governor-General's XI v West Indians at Auckland, 1968–69.

He later worked as the groundsman at Kensington Oval in Bridgetown.

References

External links

1940 births
Living people
Barbadian cricketers
West Indies Test cricketers
Barbados cricketers
People from Christ Church, Barbados
People educated at The Lodge School, Barbados